Fumi (ふみ in hiragana or フミ in katakana) is a feminine Japanese given name.

Possible writings
 史, "history"
 文, "sentence"
 二三, "two, three"
 芙美, "lotus, beauty"
The name can also be written in hiragana or katakana.

People
, Japanese actress
, Japanese football defender
, Japanese voice actress and essayist
, Japanese discus thrower
, Japanese voice actress
, Japanese actress and fashion model
, Japanese manga artist
, Japanese manga artist

Fictional characters
, a character in the manga series Yuyushiki
, a character in the anime series My-HiME
, a character in the light novel series Jinsei
, a character in the manga series Aoi Hana
, a character in the manga series QQ Sweeper
, a character in the television series Hana Moyu
, a character in the Revue Starlight franchise

See also
23455 Fumi, a main-belt asteroid
Fumie (given name)
Fumi-e

Japanese feminine given names